Young Olahraga Belawan is an Indonesian football club based in Belawan, Medan, North Sumatra. They currently compete in the Liga 3.

History
YOB Belawan was established on 2017, YOB Belawan was founded on the initiative of football fans who are Belawan residents who want to establish a football club that uses its identity to the Region Professionally. The existence of this club aims to mobilize the spirit of the younger generation in Belawan to build football achievements.

The role of PT. Pelindo I is urgently needed to support the progressive steps that have been taken, for many years this club has been managed independently on a self-help basis, and now YOB Belawan has listed its name on the PSSI administration sheet, therefore, it is deemed necessary to have a well-organized management and moral and material support from all parties.

Honours
 Liga 3 North Sumatra
 Runner-up: 2021

References

External links

Football clubs in Indonesia
2017 establishments in Indonesia
Association football clubs established in 2017
Football clubs in North Sumatra